The United Nations Development Programme (UNDP) is a United Nations agency tasked with helping countries eliminate poverty and achieve sustainable economic growth and human development. The UNDP emphasizes developing local capacity towards long-term self-sufficiency and prosperity. 

Headquartered in New York City, it is the largest UN development aid agency, with offices in 177 countries. The UNDP is funded entirely by voluntary contributions from UN member states.

Founding 
The UNDP was founded on 22 November 1965 with the merging of the Expanded Programme of Technical Assistance (EPTA) and the Special Fund in 1958. The rationale was to "avoid duplication of [their] activities". The EPTA was set up in 1949 to help the economic and political aspects of underdeveloped countries while the Special Fund was to enlarge the scope of UN technical assistance. The Special Fund arose from the idea of a Special United Nations Fund for Economic Development (SUNFED) (which was initially called the United Nations Fund for Economic Development (UNFED).

Countries such as the Nordic countries were proponents of such a United Nations (UN) controlled fund. However, the fund was opposed by developed countries, especially by the United States who was wary of the Third World dominating such a funding and preferred it to be under the auspices of the World Bank. The concept of SUNFED was dropped to form the Special Fund. This Special Fund was a compromise over the SUNFED concept, it did not provide investment capital, but only helped to bring pre-conditions for private investment.

With the US proposing and creating the International Development Association within the World Bank's umbrella, the EPTA and the Special Fund appeared to be conducting similar work. In 1962, the United Nations Economic and Social Council asked the Secretary General to consider the merits and disadvantages of merging UN technical assistance programs and in 1966, the EPTA and the Special Fund merged to form the UNDP.

Budget

In 2022, UNDP's budget was US$6,737.92 million.

Funding information table

The following table lists the top 15 DAC 5 Digit Sectors to which UNDP has committed funding, as recorded in its International Aid Transparency Initiative (IATI) publications. The UNDP claims on the IATI Registry website that the data covers 100% of development flows.

UNDP topped the Aid Transparency Index published by Publish What You Fund in 2015 and 2016, with an excellent score of 93.3%.

UNDP links and coordinates global and national efforts to achieve the goals and national development priorities laid out by host countries. UNDP focuses primarily on five developmental challenges:

Democratic governance
UNDP supports national democratic transitions by providing policy advice and technical support, improving institutional and individual capacity within countries, educating populations about and advocating for democratic reforms, promoting negotiation and dialogue, and sharing successful experiences from other countries and locations. UNDP also supports existing democratic institutions by increasing dialogue, enhancing national debate, and facilitating consensus on national governance programmes.

Poverty reduction

UNDP helps countries develop strategies to combat poverty by expanding access to economic opportunities and resources, linking poverty programmes with countries' larger goals and policies, and ensuring a greater voice for the poor. It also works at the macro level to reform trade, encourage debt relief and foreign investment, and ensure the poorest of the poor benefit from globalisation. On the ground, UNDP sponsors developmental pilot projects, promotes the role of women in development, and coordinates efforts between governments, NGOs, and outside donors. In this way, UNDP works with local leaders and governments to provide opportunities for impoverished people to create businesses and improve their economic condition.

The UNDP united nation development programme International Policy Centre for Inclusive Growth (IPC-IG) in Brasília, Brazil, expands the capacities of developing countries to design, implement and evaluate socially inclusive development projects. IPC-IG is a global forum for South-South policy dialogue and learning, having worked with more than 7,000 officials from more than 50 countries.

A 2013 evaluation of the UNDP's poverty reduction efforts states that the UNDP has effectively supported national efforts to reduce poverty, by helping governments make policy changes that benefit the poor. Nevertheless, the same evaluation also states there is a strong need for better measurement and monitoring of the impacts of the UNDP's work. The UNDP's Strategic Plan from 2014 to 2017 incorporates the recommendations of this poverty evaluation.

Crisis prevention and recovery
UNDP works to reduce the risk of armed conflicts or disasters, and promote early recovery after crisis have occurred. UNDP works through its country offices to support local government in needs assessment, capacity development, coordinated planning, and policy and standard setting.

Examples of UNDP risk reduction programmes include efforts to control small arms proliferation, strategies to reduce the impact of natural disasters, and programmes to encourage use of diplomacy and prevent violence. Recovery programmes include disarmament, demobilization and reintegration of ex-combatants, demining efforts, programmes to reintegrate displaced persons, restoration of basic services, and transitional justice systems for countries recovering from warfare.

Following the suspension of most foreign aid to Afghanistan due to its takeover by the Taliban, the UNDP took responsibility for funding most essential health services in the country, including the salaries of over 25,000 health care professionals. This was observed as being outside the organization's usual development activities, and was facilitated by special licensing by the United States government.

Environment and energy
As the poor are disproportionately affected by environmental degradation and lack of access to clean, affordable water, sanitation, and energy services, UNDP seeks to address environmental issues in order to improve developing countries' abilities to develop sustainably, increase human development and reduce poverty. UNDP works with countries to strengthen their capacity to address global environmental issues by providing innovative policy advice and linking partners through environmentally sensitive development projects that help poor people build sustainable livelihoods.

UNDP's environmental strategy focuses on effective water governance including access to water supply and sanitation, access to sustainable energy services, Sustainable land management to combat desertification and land degradation, conservation and sustainable use of biodiversity, and policies to control emissions of harmful pollutants and ozone-depleting substances. UNDP's Equator Initiative office biennially offers the Equator Prize to recognize outstanding indigenous community efforts to reduce poverty through the conservation and sustainable use of biodiversity, and thus making local contributions to achieving the Sustainable Development Goals (SDGs).

Between 1996 and 1998, the UNDP sponsored the deployment of 45 Multifunction Platforms (MFP) in rural Mali. These installations, driven by a diesel engine, power devices such as pumps, grain mills and appliances. By 2004, the number of MFPs in Mali reached 500.

In 2012 the Biodiversity Finance Initiative (BIOFIN) was established. BIOFIN brings 30 countries together to develop and implement evidence-based finance plans to safeguards biodiversity. BIOFIN has developed an innovative and adaptable methodology to guide countries to analyze the policy and institutional context for biodiversity finance; measure the current biodiversity expenditures; assess future financial needs, and identify the most suitable finance solutions to achieve national biodiversity targets.

HIV/AIDS
UNDP works to help countries prevent further spreading of and reduce the impact of HIV/AIDS, convening The Global Commission on HIV and the Law which reported in 2012.

Hub for Innovative Partnerships
Major programmes underway are:

 ART Global Initiative
 World Alliance of Cities Against Poverty
 Territorial Approach to Climate Change
 Africa–Kazakhstan Partnership for the SDGs

Human Development Report
Since 1991, the UNDP has annually published the Human Development Report, which includes topics on Human Development and the annual Human Development Index.

The Gender Inequality Index is one such topic discussed in the Human Development Report.

Evaluation 
The UNDP spends about 0.2% of its budget on internal evaluation of the effectiveness of its programmes. The UNDP's Evaluation Office is a member of the UN Evaluation Group (UNEG) which brings together all the units responsible for evaluation in the UN system. Currently the UNEG has 43 members and 3 observers.

Global Policy Centres 
The UNDP runs six Global Policy Centres, including the Seoul Policy Centre (USPC) on partnerships, the Nairobi Global Policy Centre on Resilient Ecosystems and Desertification (GPC-Nairobi), the Singapore-based Global Centre for Technology, Innovation and Sustainable Development (GC-TISD), the Istanbul International Centre for Private Sector in Development (IICPSD), the Oslo Governance Centre, and the Singapore-based Global Centre for Public Service Excellence (GCPSE) that issues the "Raffles Review" email newsletter on developments in public administration research.

UN coordination role 
UNDP plays a significant coordination role for the UN's activities in the field of development. This is mainly executed through its leadership of the UN Development Group and through the Resident Coordinator System.

United Nations Development Group 

The United Nations Development Group (UNDG) was created by the Secretary-General in 1997, to improve the effectiveness of UN development at the country level. The UNDG brings together the operational agencies working on development. The Group is chaired by the Administrator of UNDP. UNDP also provides the Secretariat to the Group.

The UNDG develops policies and procedures that allow member agencies to work together and analyze country issues, plan support strategies, implement support programs, monitor results and advocate for change. These initiatives increase UN impact in helping countries achieve the Millennium Development Goals (MDGs), including poverty reduction.

Thirty-two UN agencies are members of the UNDG. The executive committee consists of the four "founding members": UNICEF, UNFPA, WFP and UNDP. The Office of the High Commissioner for Human Rights is an ex-officio member of the executive committee.

Resident coordinator system
The Resident Coordinator (RC) system coordinates all organizations of the United Nations system dealing with operational activities for development in the field. The RC system aims to bring together the different UN agencies to improve the efficiency and effectiveness of operational activities at the country level. Resident Coordinators lead UN country teams in more than 130 countries and are the designated representatives of the Secretary-General for development operations. Working closely with national governments, Resident Coordinators and country teams advocate the interests and mandates of the UN drawing on the support and guidance of the entire UN family. It is now coordinated by the UNDG.

Innovation Facility 
The UNDP established the Innovation Facility in 2014, with support from the Government of Denmark, as a dedicated funding mechanism to nurture promising development interventions.

The Innovation Facility offers technical assistance and seed funding to collaborators across 170 countries and territories to explore new approaches to complex development challenges. Since its inception, the Innovation Facility has fostered innovation labs across all 5 regions to better deliver and monitor SDGs. In 2015, the Innovation Facility invested in 62 initiatives across 45 countries to achieve 16 SDGs.

Controversies

NSA surveillance 

Documents of Edward Snowden showed in December 2013 that British and American intelligence agencies surveillance targets with the United States' National Security Agency (NSA) included organisations such as the United Nations Development Programme, the UN's children's charity UNICEF and Médecins Sans Frontières and the Economic Community of West African States (ECOWAS).

Allegations of UNDP resources used by Hamas 

In August 2016, Israel's Shin Bet security agency publicized the arrest of Wahid Abdallah al Bursh, a Palestinian engineer employed by the UNDP, stating he had confessed to being recruited in 2014 to help Hamas, the dominant Islamist group in Gaza. Among "various assignments" Bursh performed on behalf of Hamas was "using UNDP resources" to build a maritime jetty for its fighters; no further details were provided on this claim. Shin Bet also claimed Bursh had persuaded his UNDP superiors to prioritize neighborhoods with Hamas operatives when earmarking reconstruction funds for Gaza, which was devastated by the 2014 war with Israel.

Alleged financial irregularities 
The UNDP had been criticised by members of its staff and the Bush administration of the United States for irregularities in its finances in North Korea. Artjon Shkurtaj claimed that he had found counterfeit US dollars in the programmes' safe despite staff being paid in euros. The UNDP denied keeping improper accounts and any other wrongdoing.

Disarmament and controversy 
In mid-2006, as first reported by Inner City Press and then by New Vision, UNDP halted its disarmament programmes in the Karamoja region of Uganda in response to human rights abuses in the parallel forcible disarmament programmes carried out by the Uganda People's Defence Force.

Russia UNDP GEF Project Corruption Scandal 
In 2019, reports alleging possible misappropriation of funds for UNDP projects in Russia began to appear in the mainstream media. An article called Greed and Graft in August 2019 in Foreign Policy reported the findings of a 2017 final evaluation that a UNDP Global Environment Facility greenhouse gas reduction project, the UNDP GEF Energy Efficiency Standards and Labels project in Russia with a budget of $7.8 million dollars, did not meet its goals and had "strong indications of deliberate misappropriation" of funds. The Foreign Policy article reported that concerns raised by whistleblowers Dmitry Ershov and John O'Brien and multiple other consultants to the project over many years about irregularities in the program — which were first reported internally as far back in 2011— were largely dismissed or ignored for several years by their superiors in Istanbul, New York, and Washington, as well as by donor governments, including the United States. The Foreign Policy article reported that a 2017 confidential audit appendix prepared by final evaluators found “strong indicators of deliberate misappropriation” of millions of dollars in funds from the project between 2010 and 2014.

This led in March 2020 to 12 donor governments writing a letter to UNDP Administrator Achim Steiner demanding from UNDP an independent review of UNDP's handling of the energy efficiency standards and labels project in Russia, as reported again in Foreign Policy magazine in December 2020 where it was revealed that these donors had blasted UNDP for resisting appeals to fight corruption and further reports by the Financial Times about the 'systemic nature' of the problems and also reports by various other media outlets such as Climate Change News , Passblue and in Newsroom in the New Zealand media. In January 2021, this independent report into the matter as requested by the donors was published, 'Systems and Silos'. This independent review found "irregularities" and concluded the project in question was not managed "either efficiently or effectively" by UNDP and that a number of individuals were able to 'game the relatively weak systems of governance and technical capacity.'  It suggested UNDP consider returning to the Global Environment Facility (which funded the project) its "entire management fee" as "restitution" and proposed "ongoing efforts to achieve changes in the work culture that reward greater transparency and remove fears of unfair reprisals" aimed at whistleblowers. Concerns over UNDP's failure to handle the Russia controversy in a satisfactory manner led to the government of the Netherlands withholding some 10 million euros in funding in early 2021.

In February 2022, the leaders of three leading NGOs in the fight against corruption, Transparency International, the Whistleblower International Network or WIN, and the Government Accountability Project wrote a public letter to UNDP's administrator Achim Steiner, expressing their serious concerns about the lack of whistleblower protection for John O'Brien and Dmitry Ershov by UNDP and highlighting the conclusion of the independent review on the failure by UNDP to carry out John O'Brien's whistleblower case in a satisfactory manner. According to the 2019 Foreign Policy article, Ershov claimed he was "pushed out of his U.N. job" after raising concerns about procurement irregularities and project conflicts of interest way back at the end of 2014.

In June 2022, BBC Two broadcast a 90-minute documentary, The Whistleblowers: Inside the UN, which reported on whistleblower cases across the UN system, including John O'Brien's case. It reported that O'Brien was fired from UNDP in March 2022 several days after his BBC interview. The documentary was described by The Guardian media outlet as exposing "a toxic culture" where senior UN leaders hide "behind a cloak of saintliness". As of June 2022, there has been zero accountability for the cover up among senior officials at UNDP. The only two persons at UNDP who lost their job after years and years of alleged UNDP corruption and cover up were the two whistleblowers.

Administrator 
The UNDP Administrator has the rank of an Under-Secretary-General of the United Nations. While the Administrator is often referred to as the third highest-ranking official in the UN (after the UN Secretary General and the UN Deputy Secretary General), this has never been formally codified.

In addition to his/her responsibilities as head of UNDP, the Administrator is also the vice-chair of the UN Sustainable Development Group.

The position of Administrator is appointed by the Secretary-General of the UN and confirmed by the General Assembly for a term of four years.

Achim Steiner is the current Administrator. The five countries on the UNDP board have some influence over selection of the administrator.

The first administrator of the UNDP was Paul G. Hoffman, former head of the Economic Cooperation Administration which administered the Marshall Plan.

Other holders of the position have included: Bradford Morse, former Republican congressman from Massachusetts; William Draper, venture capitalist and friend of George H. W. Bush who saw one of the UN system's major achievements, the Human Development Report, introduced during his tenure; Mark Malloch Brown, who was previously Vice President of External Affairs at the World Bank and subsequently became UN Deputy Secretary General. Kemal Derviş, a former finance minister of Turkey and senior World Bank official, was the previous UNDP Administrator. Derviş started his four-year term on 15 August 2005.

Associate Administrator 
During meetings of the United Nations Sustainable Development Group, which are chaired by the Administrator, UNDP is represented by the Associate Administrator. The position is currently held by Usha Rao-Monari, as of 6 April 2021.

Assistant administrators 
Assistant Administrators of the UNDP, Assistant United Nations Secretaries General and Directors of the Regional Bureaus are:

 Usha Rao-Monari (India), USG and Associate Administrator
 Khalida Bouzar (Algeria), UN Assistant Secretary General, UNDP Assistant Administrator and Director of the UNDP
Regional Bureau for Arab States
 Abdoulaye Mar Dieye (Senegal) for Bureau for Programme and Policy Support
 Haoliang Xu (China) for Asia and Pacific
 Mirjana Spoljaric Egger (Switzerland) for Europe and the CIS
 Luis Felipe López Calva (Mexico) for Latin America and the Caribbean

See also 

 Development aid
 Economic development
 Equator Prize
 Human development
 International Covenant on Economic, Social and Cultural Rights
 International development
 International Development Association
 List of HIV-positive people
 List of UNDP country codes
 Match Against Poverty
 UNDP Goodwill Ambassador
 United Nations Economic and Social Council (ECOSOC)
 United Nations Millennium Campaign
 United Nations Sustainable Development Group
 United Nations Volunteers
 U.S. Committee for the United Nations Development Program
 World Population Day

Notes

References

Further reading
Jackson, R. G. A., A Study of the Capacity of the United Nations Development System. 2 vols, Geneva: United Nations, 1969.
Mitcham, Chad J. 'Australia and Development Cooperation at the United Nations: Towards Poverty Reduction.' In Australia and the United Nations, edited by James Cotton and David Lee, 191–221. Canberra: Department of Foreign Affairs and Trade and Sydney: Longueville Books, 2013.

External links 
UNDP official website
Mitcham, Chad J., Jackson, Sir Robert Gillman (1911-1991), Australian Dictionary of Biography, National Centre of Biography, Australian National University, published online 2016, accessed online 5 September 2017.

 
International development organizations
United Nations General Assembly subsidiary organs
Organizations based in New York City
United Nations Development Group
1965 establishments in the United States
1965 establishments in New York (state)
Economic development